The Kristofers landslag (The Country Law of Christopher) from 1442, was passed under Christopher of Bavaria as king of Sweden in 1442. It was an amended version of the original national law, the Magnus Erikssons landslag from circa 1350. It was in effect in Sweden-Finland until the Civil Code of 1734.

History
It is unclear whether the law was ever confirmed by king Christopher. It was used in parallel to the previous Magnus Erikssons landslag. It was to be used in the country side (hence its name), while the cities were still to be governed by the Stadslagen (City law) from 1350. In 1608, the Kristofers landslag was reprinted on the order of Charles IX of Sweden, which solved the question about which law to use. The judges were also granted the right to use the old Medieval Scandinavian law in the cases when the law of 1442 was unclear.

The law was also amended with the law texts from the Law of Moses of the bible.   The 1608 biblical amendments to the Kristofers landslag, made the law seem draconian and resulted in cruel punishments for notably sexually related offences: however, as the local courts had the obligation to present their sentences to the higher courts, the biblical sentences were in practice seldom performed, as it became normal procedure for the higher courts to revoke them by claiming mitigating circumstances.

The Kristofers landslag was used uncontested in Sweden-Finland from 1608 until the Civil Code of 1734.

It is divided into the following Books  ( Swedish : "balkar" )

 Byggningabalken - Buildings
 Dråp med våda - Manslaughter
 Edsöresbalken - Breach of Peace
 Giftomålsbalken - Marriage
 Högmålsbalken - Capital cases
 Jordabalken - Land
 Konungsbalken - The King
 Såramål med vilja - Deliberate Assault
 Såramål med våda - Accidental assault
 Tingsmålsbalken - Court
 Tjuvabalken - Theft

References

 C. J. Schlyter, "Sveriges gamla lagar", band 12, utgiven 1869.

1440s in law
Medieval Sweden
Political history of Sweden
15th century in Sweden
Legal history of Sweden
1442 in Europe